Mkulazi Holding Company Limited (MHCL), is a sugar manufacturer in Tanzania, the second-largest economy in the East African Community.

Location
Mkulazi Holdings Limited plans to construct two sugar factories in the Morogoro Town of Tanzania. The government of Tanzania has ring-fenced , on which the factory is being erected. The second factory is planned at Mbigiri, also in Morogoro Region, close to Mbigiri Prison. The two factories are close to sugar plantations owned by the parent company, Mkulazi Holdings Limited.

Overview
The company is a new sugar manufacturer, established in 2017, with planned production capacity of 200,000 metric tonnes annually. The sugar factory also plans to generate  of thermal electricity, of which 40 megawatts will be used internally and 15 megawatts will be sold to the national grid. When completed as planned, the company is expected to become the largest sugar manufacturer in Tanzania, with a work-force in excess of 100,000 people. When this company begins maximum production as expected, Tanzania's sugar deficit of about 100,000 metric tonnes as of 2018, will be wiped out, creating another 100,000 tonnes of exportable surplus.

Ownership
Mkulazi Holding Company Limited, is a joint venture company that is wholly owned by the  National Social Security Fund of Tanzania (NSSFT) and the Prison Corporation Sole (PCS).

See also
 Tanzania Sugar Manufacturers
 Tanzania Economy

References

External links
 NSSF-PPF Mkulazi project lauded

Holding companies established in 2017 
Food and drink companies established in 2017
2017 establishments in Tanzania
Morogoro Region
Sugar companies of Tanzania
Agriculture in Tanzania